Koomankulam (Vavuniya-04 or Official Name 214F), (Tamil: கூமாங்குளம், romanized: Kūmāṅkuḷam; Sinhala: කුමාංකුලම්, romanized: kumāṁkulam) is a suburb and is considered to be the largest village in Sri Lanka. It is the most populated area in Vavuniya. Administered by Vavuniya South Tamil Pradeshiya Sabha.

Etymology 

The village came to be known as Koomankulam due to the abundance of Kūmā trees in the area.

Location 
Koomankulam is located 7.4 km (4.6 mi) away from Vanuniya. It is bordered to the north by Manipuram, to the east by Ganeshapuram, to the west by Pattanichipuliyankulam, and to the south by Nelukkulam.

Safety 
Koomankulam is one of the most troubled places in Vavuniya. It is very difficult for women to walk outside at night. Village with a lot of fear of thieves

Education 
Koomankulam Sithivinaygar Vidyalayam

References 

Northern Province, Sri Lanka
Villages in Sri Lanka
Vavuniya District